Welcome to Sajjanpur is a 2008 Indian Hindi comedy film directed by Shyam Benegal and starring Shreyas Talpade and Amrita Rao in the lead roles. The film is by noted Parallel cinema director, Shyam Benegal, marking his return to comedy after filming Charandas Chor (1975). Even though Benegal is responsible for other films in the parallel cinema genre, this film was one of his mainstream Bollywood films. It was a remake of the 1977 film Palkon Ki Chhaon Mein. The film was both critically and commercially successful.

Plot 

Mahadev (Shreyas Talpade) is an unemployed graduate with a Bachelor of Arts from Satna college who lives with his mother, is forced to make a living writing letters for the uneducated people of his village. His real ambition is to become a novel writer. Through his humble occupation, Mahadev has the potential to impact numerous lives. The movie is a satirical, but warm-hearted portrait of life in rural India. He realizes this passion when an aunt of his wants him to write a letter to her son who has treated his mother with disrespect and the letter seemed to have worked. This made her aunt tell the villagers what an amazing writer he truly was. Initially the village folk would come to his home to get their letters written but his mother did not approve of it so he decided to set up a small work space near the post office.

Among Mahadev's customers are:
 Mahadev's childhood crush and second grade classmate Kamla who eventually became a school dropout because of her seizures (Amrita Rao) is desperate for communication from her husband Bansi Ram (Kunal Kapoor), who works as a labourer at a dockyard in Mumbai. In the letters to her husband, a jealous Mahadev writes the opposite of the loving messages Kamla wants to convey, while faking what her husband has written to her.

 A hurried mother (Ila Arun) who wants to get her ill-starred daughter, Vindhya (Divya Dutta) married.
 A landlord whose wife is a candidate for the village Sarpanch, and who wants all her political rivals eliminated from the race.
 A eunuch Munni who is contesting the elections for the village Sarpanch but fears the threats from the landlord.
 A love-lorn compounder, Ram Kumar (Ravi Kishan), who is crazy about the widowed daughter-in-law Shobha Rani (Rajeshwari Sachdev) of a retired army soldier.

Mahadev manages to get his friend engaged, police protection for Munni, and almost kisses Kamla before they are interrupted. However Munni is killed after winning the election by the opposition, and he learns a shocking truth about Kamla's husband who used to sell his blood so he could earn a reasonable amount of money. It soon turns out that the story was a fictional novel written by the real Mahadev, but it is mostly based on his own experiences. Though it turns out that some of the villagers didn't exactly have happy endings, Mahadev sorts out his mistakes and accomplishes his long-held dream of writing a novel.

As Mahadev, under pseudo name Sukhdev, reveals that Munnibai became a successful politician, becoming an MLA, or a Member of the State Legislature, with high connections and powerful people surrounding her. It is also revealed that Kamla and Bansi are happy in small house in Mumbai, who come to visit Sajjanpur every Diwali. In midst of all these good news, Mahadev notes that Ram Kumar and Shobha Rani were lynched because members of their community opposed a widow getting remarried. Mahadev also notes that he married the ill-starred Vindhya after wooing her by writing 40 letters. While most people consider an ill-starred person to be a great misfortune, Mahadev notes that he became successful due to his marriage, as he paid down his farm land mortgage, built a wonderful house and realised his dream of writing a novel.

Cast 

 Shreyas Talpade as Mahadev Kushwaha
 Amrita Rao as Kamla Kumbharan, clay pot maker
 Kunal Kapoor as Bansi Ram
 Ravi Kishan as Ram Kumar
 Ravi Jhankal as Munnibai Mukhanni
 Yashpal Sharma as Ramsingh
 Rajeshwari Sachdev as Shobha Rani, Ramkumar's love interest
 Divya Dutta as Vindhya
 Ila Arun as Ramsakhi Pannawali
 Lalit Mohan Tiwari as Subedar Singh, father-in law of Shobha Rani
 Rajit Kapur as Collector
 Mangala Kenkare as Mahadev's mother
 Vineeta Malik (Kamla's mother-in-law)
 Daya Shankar Pandey as Chidamiram Naga Sapera
 Sri Vallabh Vyas as Ramavtar Tyagi, school teacher of Mahadev and Kamla
 Preeti Nigam as Jamuna Bai

Soundtrack 
Music of the film is by Shantanu Moitra. The music was released on 5 September 2008., there are a total of seven songs in the soundtrack including one remix.

 "Sitaram Sitaram" - KK
 "Ek Meetha Marz De Ke" - Madhushree, Mohit Chauhan
 "Bheeni Bheeni Mehki Mehki" - KK, Shreya Ghoshal
 "Dildara Dildara" - Sunidhi Chauhan, Sonu Nigam
 "Aadmi Azaad Hai" - Kailash Kher
 "Munni Ki Baari" - Ajay Jhingran
 "Sitaram Sitaram" (remix) - KK

Reception 
Upon its release, the film received positive reviews and became a sleeper hit at the box office. An Indiatimes review said, "Shyam Benegal has always been accredited as a mesmerizing storyteller known for making 'meaningful' cinema. This time he also caters to commercial consumers, coming up with his most 'entertaining' attempt, by far."

Khalid Mohamed of Hindustan Times gave the film a 3 out of 5 stars, and stated "Sajjanpur is different, it has a conscience, and merits a ticket from those who have one too". Times of India gave the film 3 out of 5 stars and stated, "It's simple, uncomplicated storytelling leaves a smile on your face". The Economic Times stated, "Shyam Benegal has always been accredited as a mesmerizing storyteller known for making 'meaningful' cinema. This time he also caters to commercial consumers, coming up with his most 'entertaining' attempt, by far". [IMDB] Rated 6.9 out of 10 and stated An educated man spends his days writing letters for the varied inhabitants of his small, poor, and illiterate village, in this political and social satire.

Awards and nominations
 Amrita Rao - Winner, Stardust Best Actress Award
Ashok Mishra - Winner,  Mirchi Music Award for Upcoming Lyricist of The Year

References

External links 
 
 
 Sen, Meheli (2011) "Vernacular Modernities and Fitful Globalities in Shyam Benegal’s Cinematic Provinces", in: manycinemas 1, 8-22, Online, pdf-version

2008 films
2000s Hindi-language films
Films directed by Shyam Benegal
Indian comedy films
UTV Motion Pictures films
Remakes of Indian films
2008 comedy films
Hindi-language comedy films